Hassan al-Imam (March 6, 1919, in Mansoura, Egypt – January 29, 1988) was a prominent Egyptian film director. He was nicknamed the Box-office King.

Early life
Hassan Al-Imam was born on March 6, 1919, in the city of Mansoura, his father al-Imam pasha Al-Imam was a wealthy businessman. Hassan al-Imam was persistent, open-minded, and interested in public events, especially in theatrical art events, due to the proliferation of theaters at that time, and the lack of widespread cinema. He was also a lover of music. He received his education at the Frere School in al-Kharnfash.

Career
Hassan Al-Imam began his career in the 1940s, and worked as an assistant director in a number of films such as Muhammad Ali Street, Hassan and Hassan, and Miss Boussa. He got his first directing opportunity in 1946 with his first film, Angels in Hell (1947). In the following year, he directed the films; Women are Devils (1948),  and The Fame and the Rich (1948). His real breakthrough came in the early 1950s, was the films; The Two Orphans (1949), followed by; Calumnied by the People (1950), I am Well Born (1951), Time of Miracles (1952), and I will never Cry (1957).

Al-Imam films achieved high box-office revenues, which made him nicknamed "Box-office King" and "Director of masterpieces". In the 1960s, he directed the films; The Sins (1962), Alley of the Pestle (1963), and the Naguib Mahfouz's Cairo trilogy adaptation: Between Al-Qasrayn (1963), Qasr Al-Shawq (1967) and Al-Sukkariyyah (1973). He also presented: Love and Adoration (1960), I Accuse (1960), and Money and Women (1960), The Dumb (1961), The Student (1961), The Miracle (1962), Shafiqa the Copt-girl (1963), The Nun (1965) among others. In the 1970s, Al-Imam presented Love and Pride (1972) and gave up a little on melodrama films to present other genres.

After the tremendous success of Watch Out for Zouzou (1972) and its continuation in theaters for over a year, his films were dominated by a lyrical and showy character during that period. Al-Imam presented similar experiences in films such as: My Story with Time (1973), Amira, my Love (1974), Truth has A Voice (1976), The Son of a Local Man (1979) and other films. Al-Imam directed one television work, the series “His Majesty is Love”, and he directed a radio serial about the life of Badi’a Masabni. And he directed one play for the theater by Naguib El-Rihani, entitled “Oh, sweet woman, don’t play with matches.” Hassan Al-Imam’s style was unique and distinguished from others of his generation, and he presented in the 1980s; Blood on A Rose Dress (1982), The Age of Love (1986) written by Naguib Mahfouz, and his last film was Tomorrow is better than Today (1986), al-Imam made three films listed in the Top 100 Egyptian films list.

Personal life 
Al-Imam was married to Naemat Al-Hadidi, a housewife together they had two sons and a daughter, Hussein (1951–2014), music composer, arranger, singer, and works sometimes as an actor, Moudy, writer/composer of film soundtracks and Zainab, a journalist in Al-Ahram. Al-Imam died in Cairo in January 29, 1988.

Filmography

References

External links 
 

Egyptian film directors
1919 births
1988 deaths
People from Mansoura, Egypt